National Route 401 (N401) forms part of the Philippine highway network. It connects the municipalities of Noveleta to the city of General Trias through the municipality of Rosario.

Route description 
N401 covers the Noveleta to General Trias segment of what is called by DPWH as the Noveleta–Naic–Tagaytay Road.

Marseilla Street

N401 commences at the junction with Magdiwang Highway and Manila–Cavite Road, both components of N402, and General Antonio Street in Noveleta as Marseilla Street. It runs southwest up to Catalino Abueg Street, where it forms a corner of the Rosario Town Plaza, in the Rosario town proper.

General Trias Drive

Upon meeting Catalino Abueg Street in Rosario, N401 veers southeast and becomes General Trias Drive. Notable landmarks along this route include the Petron Rosario Depot, SM City Rosario, Gate 1 of the Cavite Export Processing Zone, and the Tejeros Convention Site. N401 then enters the city of General Trias, where it ends at the junction with Antero Soriano Highway and Governor Ferrer Drive in barangay Tejero.

Intersections

References

External links 
 Department of Public Works and Highways

Roads in Cavite